The Golden Road (1965–1973) is a twelve-CD box set of the Grateful Dead's studio and live albums released during their time with Warner Bros. Records, from 1965 to 1973. After 1973, the band went on to create its own label, Grateful Dead Records.  Also included in the box set is a two-disc bonus album, Birth of the Dead, containing very early recordings of the band.

The Golden Road contains expanded and remastered versions of all of the albums released during the band's time on contract with Warner Bros. Also included are numerous studio outtakes and live tracks. In 2003 these bonus tracks were appended to the individual releases of the respective albums, and Birth of the Dead was also given independent release.

The albums included in the box set are Birth of the Dead, The Grateful Dead, Anthem of the Sun, Aoxomoxoa, Live/Dead, Workingman's Dead, American Beauty, Grateful Dead (also known as Skull and Roses), Europe '72, and History of the Grateful Dead, Volume One (Bear's Choice). Anthem of the Sun appears in its original (1968) mix, but the Aoxomoxoa in this set is the 1971 remix, not the original (1969) mix.

Track listing

Disc one: Birth of the Dead, disc 1
 Birth of the Dead: The Studio Sides
 "Early Morning Rain" (Lightfoot) – 3:22
 "I Know You Rider" (traditional) – 2:41
 "Mindbender (Confusion's Prince)" (Garcia, Lesh) – 2:41
 "The Only Time Is Now" (Grateful Dead) – 2:24
 "Caution (Do Not Stop on Tracks)" (Grateful Dead) – 3:17
 "Can't Come Down" (Grateful Dead) – 3:04
 "Stealin' (instrumental)" (Cannon) – 2:40
 "Stealin' (w/ vocals)" (Cannon) – 2:36
 "Don't Ease Me In (instrumental)" (traditional) – 2:01
 "Don't Ease Me In (w/ vocals)" (traditional) – 2:02
 "You Don't Have to Ask" (Grateful Dead) – 3:35
 "Tastebud (instrumental)" (McKernan) – 7:04
 "Tastebud (w/ vocals" (McKernan) – 4:35
 "I Know You Rider" (traditional) – 2:36
 "Cold Rain and Snow (instrumental)" (traditional) – 3:15
 "Cold Rain and Snow (w/ vocals)" (traditional) – 3:17
 "Fire in the City" (Krug) – 3:19

Disc two: Birth of the Dead, disc 2
 Birth of the Dead: The Live Sides
 "Viola Lee Blues" (Lewis) – 9:39
 "Don't Ease Me In" (traditional) – 2:43
 "Pain in My Heart" (Neville) – 4:24
 "Sitting on Top of the World" (Chatmon, Vinson) – 3:51
 "It's All over Now, Baby Blue" (Dylan) – 5:12
 "I'm a King Bee" (Moore) – 8:52
 "Big Boss Man" (Dixon, Smith) – 5:11
 "Standing on the Corner" (Grateful Dead) – 3:46
 "In the Pines" (Bryant, McMichen) – 4:55
 "Nobody's Fault But Mine" (Johnson) – 4:15
 "Next Time You See Me" (Forest, Harvey) – 2:47
 "One Kind Favor" (Hopkins, Taub) – 3:44
 "He Was a Friend of Mine" (traditional) – 4:45
 "Keep Rolling By" (traditional) – 7:57

Disc three: The Grateful Dead
 The Grateful Dead
 "The Golden Road (To Unlimited Devotion)" (Grateful Dead) – 2:07
 "Beat It on Down the Line" (Fuller) – 2:27
 "Good Morning Little School Girl" (Williamson) – 6:32
 "Cold Rain and Snow" (Grateful Dead) – 2:26
 "Sitting on Top of the World" (Jacobs, Carter) – 2:43
 "Cream Puff War" (Garcia) – 3:18
 "(Walk Me Out in the) Morning Dew" (Dobson, Rose) – 5:16
 "New, New Minglewood Blues" (traditional) – 2:40
 "Viola Lee Blues" (Lewis) – 10:09
 "Alice D. Millionaire" (Grateful Dead) – 2:22
 "Overseas Stomp (The Lindy)" (Jones, Shade) – 2:24
 "Tastebud" (McKernan) – 4:18
 "Death Don't Have No Mercy" (Davis) – 5:20
 "Viola Lee Blues" (edited version) (Lewis) – 3:00
 "Viola Lee Blues" (live at DANCE HALL, Rio Nido, CA 9/3/67) (Lewis) – 23:13

Disc four: Anthem of the Sun
 Anthem of the Sun
 "That's It For The Other One" – 7:40:
 "Cryptical Envelopment" (Garcia)
 "Quodlibet For Tenderfeet" (Garcia, Kreutzmann, Lesh, McKernan, Weir)
 "The Faster We Go, The Rounder We Get" (Kreutzmann, Weir)
 "We Leave The Castle" (Constanten)
 "New Potato Caboose" (Lesh, Petersen) – 8:26
 "Born Cross-Eyed" (Weir) – 2:04
 "Alligator" (Lesh, McKernan, Hunter) – 11:20
 "Caution (Do Not Stop On Tracks)" (Garcia, Kreutzmann, Lesh, McKernan, Weir) – 9:37
 "Alligator" (live at SHRINE AUDITORIUM, Los Angeles, CA 8/23/68) (Lesh, McKernan, Hunter) – 18:43
 "Caution (Do Not Stop On Tracks)" (live at SHRINE AUDITORIUM, Los Angeles, CA 8/23/68) (Garcia, Kreutzmann, Lesh, McKernan, Weir) – 11:38
 "Feedback" (live at SHRINE AUDITORIUM, Los Angeles, CA 8/23/68) (Grateful Dead) – 4:01
 "Born Cross-Eyed" (single version) (Weir) – 2:55

Disc five: Aoxomoxoa
 Aoxomoxoa
 "St. Stephen" (Garcia, Hunter, Lesh) – 4:26
 "Dupree's Diamond Blues" (Garcia, Hunter) – 3:32
 "Rosemary" (Garcia, Hunter) – 1:58
 "Doin' That Rag" (Garcia, Hunter) – 4:41
 "Mountains Of The Moon" (Garcia, Hunter) – 4:02
 "China Cat Sunflower" (Garcia, Hunter) – 3:40
 "What's Become Of The Baby" (Garcia, Hunter) – 8:12
 "Cosmic Charlie" (Garcia, Hunter) – 5:29
 "Clementine Jam" (studio jam 8/13/68) (Grateful Dead) – 10:46
 "Nobody's Spoonful Jam" (studio jam 8/13/68) (Grateful Dead) – 10:04
 "The Eleven Jam" (studio jam 8/13/68) (Grateful Dead) – 15:00
 "Cosmic Charlie" (live at AVALON BALLROOM, San Francisco, CA 1/25/69) – 6:47

Disc six: Live/Dead
 Live/Dead
  "Dark Star" (live at FILLMORE WEST, San Francisco, CA 2/27/69) (Grateful Dead, Hunter) – 23:18
  "St. Stephen" (live at FILLMORE WEST, San Francisco, CA 2/27/69) (Hunter, Garcia, Lesh) – 6:31
  "The Eleven" (live at AVALON BALLROOM, San Francisco, CA 1/26/69) (Hunter, Lesh) – 9:18
  "Turn On Your Lovelight" (live at AVALON BALLROOM, San Francisco, CA 1/26/69) (Scott, Malone) – 15:05
  "Death Don't Have No Mercy" (live at FILLMORE WEST, San Francisco, CA 3/2/69) (Davis) – 10:28
  "Feedback" (live at FILLMORE WEST, San Francisco, CA 3/2/69) (McGannahan Skjellyfetti) – 7:49
  "And We Bid You Goodnight" (live at FILLMORE WEST, San Francisco, CA 3/2/69) (traditional-) – 0:37
  "Dark Star" (single version)"  – 2:44
  "Hidden Track" (radio promo) – 1:00

Disc seven: Workingman's Dead
 Workingman's Dead
 "Uncle John's Band" (Garcia, Hunter) – 4:45
 "High Time" (Garcia, Hunter) – 5:14
 "Dire Wolf" (Garcia, Hunter) – 3:14
 "New Speedway Boogie" (Garcia, Hunter) – 4:06
 "Cumberland Blues" (Garcia, Hunter, Lesh) – 3:16
 "Black Peter" (Garcia, Hunter) – 5:43
 "Easy Wind" (Hunter) – 4:58
 "Casey Jones" (Garcia, Hunter) – 4:38
 "New Speedway Boogie" (alternate mix) – 4:10
 "Dire Wolf" (live at VETERANS MEMORIAL HALL, Santa Rosa, CA 6/27/69) – 2:31
 "Black Peter" (live at GOLDEN HALL COMMUNITY CONCOURSE, San Diego, CA 1/10/70) – 9:07
 "Easy Wind" (live at SPRINGER'S INN, Portland, OR 1/16/70) – 8:09
 "Cumberland Blues" (live at OREGON STATE UNIVERSITY, Corvalis, OR 1/17/70) – 4:52
 "Mason's Children" (live at CIVIC AUDITORIUM, Honolulu, HI 1/24/70) (Garcia, Hunter, Lesh, Weir) – 6:32
 "Uncle John's Band" (live at WINTERLAND ARENA, San Francisco, CA 10/4/70) – 7:57

Disc eight: American Beauty
 American Beauty
 "Box of Rain" (Hunter, Lesh) – 5:18
 "Friend of the Devil" (Garcia, Dawson, Hunter) – 3:24
 "Sugar Magnolia" (Weir, Hunter) – 3:19
 "Operator" (Ron McKernan) – 2:25
 "Candyman" (Garcia, Hunter) – 6:12
 "Ripple" (Garcia, Hunter) – 4:09
 "Brokedown Palace" (Garcia, Hunter) – 4:09
 "Till the Morning Comes" (Garcia, Hunter) – 3:09
 "Attics of My Life" (Garcia, Hunter) – 5:14
 "Truckin'" (Garcia, Lesh, Weir, Hunter) – 5:17
 "Truckin'" (single edit) – 3:17
 "Friend of the Devil" (live at FILLMORE EAST, New York City, NY 5/15/70) – 4:21
 "Candyman" (live at WINTERLAND ARENA, San Francisco, CA 4/15/70) – 5:18
 "Till the Morning Comes" (live at WINTERLAND ARENA, San Francisco, CA 10/4/70) – 3:20
 "Attics of My Life" (live at FILLMORE WEST, San Francisco, CA 6/6/70) – 6:31
 "Truckin'" (live at LEGION STADIUM, El Monte, CA 12/26/70) – 10:10
 "Ripple" (single mix) – 4:09 (hidden bonus track)
 "American Beauty Radio Spot – 1:00 (hidden bonus track)

Disc nine: Skull and Roses
 Grateful Dead (Skull and Roses)
 "Bertha" (live at FILLMORE EAST, New York City, NY 4/27/71) (Garcia, Hunter) – 5:43
 "Mama Tried" (live at FILLMORE EAST, New York City, NY 4/26/71) (Haggard) – 2:43
 "Big Railroad Blues" (live at MANHATTAN CENTER, New York City, NY 4/5/71) (Lewis) – 3:35
 "Playin' in the Band" (live at MANHATTAN CENTER, New York City, NY 4/6/71) (Hart, Hunter, Weir) – 4:40
 "The Other One" (live at FILLMORE EAST, New York City, NY 4/28/71) (Kreutzmann, Weir) – 18:07
 "Me and My Uncle" (live at FILLMORE EAST, New York City, NY 4/29/71) (John Phillips) – 3:04
 "Big Boss Man" (live at FILLMORE EAST, New York City, NY 4/26/71) (Dixon, Smith) – 5:14
 "Me and Bobbie McGee" (live at FILLMORE EAST, New York City, NY 4/27/71) (Foster, Kristofferson) – 5:42
 "Johnny B. Goode" (live at WINTERLAND ARENA, San Francisco, CA 3/24/71) (Berry) – 3:44
 "Wharf Rat" (live at FILLMORE EAST, New York City, NY 4/26/71) (Garcia, Hunter) – 8:32
 "Not Fade Away > Goin' Down the Road Feeling Bad" (live at MANHATTAN CENTER, New York City, NY 4/5/71) (Holly, Petty) – 9:26
 "Oh, Boy!" (live at MANHATTAN CENTER, New York City, NY 4/6/71) (Petty, Tilghman, West) – 2:50
 "I'm a Hog for You" (live at MANHATTAN CENTER, New York City, NY 4/6/71) (Leiber, Stoller) – 5:20
 "Hidden track" (radio spot) – 1:00

Disc ten: Europe '72, disc 1
 Europe '72
 "Cumberland Blues" (live at WEMBLEY EMPIRE POOL, London, England 4/8/72) (Garcia, Hunter, Lesh) – 5:43
 "He's Gone" (live at the CONCERTGEBOUW, Amsterdam, The Netherlands 5/10/72) (Garcia, Hunter) – 6:57
 "One More Saturday Night" (live at the STRAND LYCEUM, London, England 5/24/72) (Weir) – 4:49
 "Jack Straw" (live at L'OLYMPIA, Paris, France 5/3/72) (Hunter, Weir) – 4:49
 "You Win Again" (live at the STRAND LYCEUM, London, England 5/24/72) (Williams) – 4:00
 "China Cat Sunflower" (live at L'OLYMPIA, Paris, France 5/3/72) (Garcia, Hunter) – 5:32
 "I Know You Rider" (live at L'OLYMPIA, Paris, France 5/3/72) (traditional) – 5:03
 "Brown-Eyed Woman" (live at TIVOLI CONCERT HALL, Copenhagen, Denmark 4/14/72) (Garcia, Hunter) – 4:38
 "It Hurts Me Too" (live at the STRAND LYCEUM, London, England 5/24/72) (James, Sehorn) – 7:20
 "Ramble on Rose" (live at the STRAND LYCEUM, London, England 5/26/72) (Garcia, Hunter) – 6:04
 "Sugar Magnolia" (live at L'OLYMPIA, Paris, France 5/4/72) (Hunter, Weir) – 7:10
 "Mr. Charlie" (live at the STRAND LYCEUM, London, England 5/26/72) (Hunter, McKernan) – 3:39
 "Tennessee Jed" (live at L'OLYMPIA, Paris, France 5/3/72) (Garcia, Hunter) – 7:18
 "The Stranger (Two Souls in Communion)" (live at JAHRHUNDERT HALLE, Frankfurt, West Germany 4/26/72) (McKernan) – 6:50

Disc eleven: Europe '72, disc 2
 Europe '72
 "Truckin'" (live at the STRAND LYCEUM, London, England 5/26/72) (Garcia, Hunter, Lesh, Weir) – 13:06
 "Epilogue" (live at the STRAND LYCEUM, London, England 5/26/72) (Grateful Dead) – 5:10
 "Prelude" (live at the STRAND LYCEUM, London, England 5/26/72) (Grateful Dead) – 7:37
 "Morning Dew" (live at the STRAND LYCEUM, London, England 5/26/72) (Dobson, Rose) – 11:41
 "Looks Like Rain" (live at WEMBLEY EMPIRE POOL, London, England 4/8/72) (Barlow, Weir) – 7:42
 "Good Lovin'" > (live at TIVOLI CONCERT HALL, Copenhagen, Denmark 4/14/72) (Clark, Resnick) – 18:30
 "Caution (Do Not Stop on Tracks)" > (live at TIVOLI CONCERT HALL, Copenhagen, Denmark, 4/14/72)(Garcia, Kreutzmann, Lesh) – 4:39
 "Who Do You Love?" > (live at TIVOLI CONCERT HALL, Copenhagen, Denmark 4/14/72) (Ellas McDaniel) – 0:22
 "Caution (Do Not Stop on Tracks)" > (live at TIVOLI CONCERT HALL, Copenhagen, Denmark 4/14/72) (Garcia, Kreutzmann, Lesh) – 1:43
 "Good Lovin'" (live at TIVOLI CONCERT HALL, Copenhagen, Denmark 4/14/72) (Clark, Resnick) – 5:59
 "The Yellow Dog Story" (Hidden Track) (live at WEMBLEY EMPIRE POOL, London, England 4/8/72) (Grateful Dead) – 3:09

Disc twelve: Bear's Choice
 History of the Grateful Dead, Volume One (Bear's Choice)
 "Katie Mae" (live at FILLMORE EAST, New York City, NY 2/13/70) (Hopkins) – 4:44
 "Dark Hollow" (live at FILLMORE EAST, New York City, NY 2/14/70) (Browning) – 3:52
 "I've Been All Around This World" (live at FILLMORE EAST, New York City, NY 2/14/70) (traditional) – 4:18
 "Wake Up Little Susie" (live at FILLMORE EAST, New York City, NY 2/13/70) (Bryant, Bryant) – 2:31
 "Black Peter" (live at FILLMORE EAST, New York City, NY 2/13/70) (Garcia, Hunter) – 7:27
 "Smokestack Lightning" (live at FILLMORE EAST, New York City, NY 2/13/70) (Howlin' Wolf) – 17:59
 "Hard to Handle" (live at FILLMORE EAST, New York City, NY 2/14/70) (Isbell, Jones, Redding) – 6:29
 "Good Lovin'" (live at FILLMORE EAST, New York City, NY 2/13/70) (Clark, Resnick) – 8:56
 "Big Boss Man" (live at FILLMORE WEST, San Francisco, CA 2/5/70) (Dixon, Smith) – 4:53
 "Smokestack Lightning" (Version Two) (live at FILLMORE WEST, San Francisco, CA 2/8/70) (Howlin' Wolf) – 15:11
 "Sitting on Top of the World" (live at FILLMORE WEST, San Francisco, CA 2/8/70) (Chatmon, Vinson) – 3:20

Personnel
Grateful Dead:
 Jerry Garcia – lead guitar, acoustic guitar, pedal steel guitar, piano, kazoo, vibraslap, vocals
 Bob Weir – rhythm guitar, acoustic guitar, 12-string guitar, kazoo, vocals
 Ron "Pigpen" McKernan – keyboards, organ, celesta, acoustic guitar, harmonica, congas, claves, percussion, vocals
 Bill Kreutzmann – drums, percussion
 Phil Lesh – bass, guitar, piano, harpsichord, trumpet, kazoo, timpani, vocals
 Mickey Hart – drums, percussion
 Tom Constanten – keyboards, prepared piano, piano, electronic tape
 Keith Godchaux – piano
 Donna Jean Godchaux – vocals
 Robert Hunter – songwriter

Additional performers:
 for a comprehensive listing, see individual album pages

Production:

 James Austin, David Lemieux – producers
 Dennis McNally, Lou Tambakos – Birth Of The Dead concept & compilation
 Peter McQuaid – executive producer
 Michael Wesley Johnson – associate producer, research coordination
 Eileen Law – archival researcher, archivist
 Cassidy Law – coordinator
 Dennis McNally – consultant
 Jeffrey Norman – mixing
 Joe Gastwirt/Oceanview Digital, Jo Motta – mastering and production consultants
 Jimmy Edwards – product manager
 Gary Peterson – discographical annotation
 Shawn Amos – liner notes coordination
 Vanessa Atkins – editorial supervision
 Daniel Goldmark – editorial research
 Hugh Brown – reissue art director
 Malia Doss – business affairs at Rhino Records
 Mickey Hart – project assistant
Bob Weir – project assistant
 Bill Kreutzmann – project assistant
Bill Inglot – project assistant
Steve Lang – project assistant
Patrick Kraus – project assistant
Jan Simmons – project assistant
Blair Jackson – project assistant
Steve Silberman – project assistant
Hale Milgrim – project assistant
David Gans – project assistant
 Owsley Stanley – project assistant
 Jeff Gold – project assistant
Connie Mosley – project assistant
Gary Lambert – project assistant
Bill Belmont – project assistant
Neil Ruttenberg – project assistant

Charts
Billboard

RIAA Certification

References

Works cited
 Hochman, Steve. "A 12-CD Grateful Dead Set? (No, It’s Not All One Song)", Los Angeles Times, June 10, 2001

2001 compilation albums
Grateful Dead compilation albums
Rhino Records compilation albums